Welcome to the Night Sky is the third album by Canadian indie rock band Wintersleep. It was released October 2, 2007, by Labwork Music.  In 2008, just after the album's release, Wintersleep won the Juno Award for New Group of the Year.

The album was produced by Tony Doogan, famous for his work with Mogwai and Belle and Sebastian, among others.

Track listing
All songs were written by Wintersleep.

Special edition bonus tracks
 "The Kids are Ultra-Violent" – 3:33
 "Early in the Morning" – 4:30
Wintersleep.com MP3 download bonus tracks
 "The Kids are Ultra-Violent" – 3:33
 "Oblivion (Acoustic Live at SXSW 2008)" - 2:57
 "Weighty Ghost (Acoustic Live at SXSW 2008)" - 3:04
 "Nerves Normal, Breath Normal (Live at Summersonic)" - 14:00

Credits
Paul Murphy - Guitar, Lead Vocals
Greg Calbi - Mastering
Loel Campbell - Drums, Percussion, Backing Vocals
Tim D'Eon - Guitar, Keyboards, Backing Vocals
Tony Doogan - Engineer, Mixing, Producer
Jud Haynes - Bass guitar
Jon Samuel - Guitar,  Backing Vocals
Darren Van Niekerk - Assistant
Janesta Boudreau - Backing Vocals
Graham Walsh - Backing Vocals

Reception
"Weighty Ghost" and "Oblivion" both received extensive airplay on Canadian modern rock radio. The song "Weighty Ghost" was the opening theme of the Canadian TV show Cracked and was also featured in the show Being Human. Wintersleep also performed "Weighty Ghost" on The Late Show with David Letterman.

References

2007 albums
Wintersleep albums
Albums produced by Tony Doogan